Ojamajo Doremi was originally broadcast on TV Asahi from February 7, 1999 to January 30, 2000, with a total of 51 episodes. The show was directed by Junichi Sato and Takuya Igarashi, while the animation was produced by Toei Animation. It replaced the time slot of Yume no Crayon Oukoku when that show ended. After Ojamajo Doremi ended, it was followed up by a direct sequel, Ojamajo Doremi Sharp.

When 4Kids Entertainment localized the show, the opening theme was replaced with a new song titled "Just Like Magic", while the ending credits sequence plays an instrumental version.

In 2003, 4Kids Entertainment began working on a licensing contract with Toei Animation with plans of increasing the female television demographic for their Saturday morning block, but the deal was not sealed until 2004. Although initially planned for debut in November 2005, the show appeared in the United States on 4Kids TV with a preview episode on August 13, 2005. Episodes began regularly airing on September 10, 2005; they aired 26 episodes by March 11, 2006. After that, the show was in reruns until August 19, 2006. Magical DoReMi continued its run on November 13, 2007, exclusively on the network's web site and released its last episode on May 2, 2008. The first 26 episodes were grouped into one season, while the remaining episodes were grouped as "season 2" on 4Kids TV's website.

The English version by 4Kids Entertainment was heavily edited and localized for Western audiences, and carried a TV-Y E/I rating. Additionally, episode 30 from the original Japanese version of the show was skipped, having never been dubbed and released in English.

Episode list

References

1999 Japanese television series debuts
2000 Japanese television series endings
Ojamajo Doremi series
Ojamajo Doremi episode lists